Gap junction delta-2 (GJD2), also known as connexin-36 (Cx36) or gap junction alpha-9 (GJA9), is a protein that in humans is encoded by the GJD2 gene.

Function 

This gene is a member of the large family of connexins that are required for the formation of gap junctions. Six connexin monomers form a hemichannel, or connexon, on the cell surface. This connexon can interact with a connexon from a neighboring cell, thus forming a channel linking the cytoplasm of the 2 cells.

References

Further reading

Connexins